Samuel or Sam Francis may refer to:

 Samuel Francis (cricketer) (born 1958), Jamaican cricketer
 Samuel Francis (politician) (1830–1906), Utah politician
 Sam Francis (1923–1994), artist
 Sam Francis (American football) (1913–2002), American football player and coach, and Olympic shot putter
 Samuel T. Francis (1947–2005), Paleoconservative columnist
 Samuel Francis (athlete) (born 1987), Nigerian-Qatari sprinter
 Sam Francis Page (born 1974), fitness trainer
 Samuel Trevor Francis (1834–1925), English hymn writer
 Samuel Ward Francis (1835–1886), American writer, inventor and physician

See also